Stree was a Bengali television soap opera Masala series that premiered on 26 December 2016, and aired on Zee Bangla. It was produced by Snehasish Chakraborty and starred Neha Amandeep and Neel Bhattacharya in lead roles, and Goutam De, Rita Koiral and Dolon Roy in supporting roles. It also starred Moumita Gupta in an antagonistic role. It replaced the popular show Goyenda Ginni. The show telecasted at Monday to Sunday at 7:30 pm. The show went off air on 11 February 2018 and was replaced by Amloki.

Cast
 Neel Bhattacharya as Prwithwijit Deb / Aksar Sen (Main male lead) 
 Neha Amandeep as Nirupama / Niru (Main female lead)
 Sanjib Sarkar as Niru's father
 Rita Koiral as Sabitri / Niru's Mother 
 Moumita Gupta as Shakuntala (Former Antagonist)
 Goutam Dey as Indrajit Deb 
 Rahul Dev Bose as Vicky Deb (Main Antagonist) 
 Madhurima Basak as Rima Deb (Main Antagonist)
 Gourav Ghoshal as Biju Deb (Former Antagonist)
 Priya Mondal as Aliya
 Vikramjit Chowdhury as Rishi
 Sananda Basak as Mukul's Wife
 Aditya Roy as Mukul
 Chandraniv Mukherjee as Goba
 Dolon Roy as Namita
 Ritu Rai Acharya as Niki
 Supriyo Dutta as Goba and Rishi's Father
 Tapashi Roy Chowdhury as Rishi's Aunt
 Madhurima Paul as Torsha / Rishi's Fiancée
 Sonali Chatterjee as Sonali

References

External links
Stree on ZEE5

2013 Indian television series debuts
Bengali-language television programming in India
Zee Bangla original programming